Scopula michinoku is a moth of the family Geometridae. It is found in Japan.

References

Moths described in 1994
michinoku
Moths of Japan